Exit Stance is an EP by JK Flesh, a moniker of English musician Justin Broadrick, and was released on November 30, 2017 through Downwards Records as a digital download and as a vinyl. Described as more dance-oriented than the previous JK Flesh EP, Nothing Is Free, Exit Stance covers themes of "whiteout, transcendence and self-annihilation."

Reception

Writing for Resident Advisor, Andrew Ryce said "Doubling down on what he does best while stepping into a new arena with confidence, Exit Stance establishes Broadrick as a bonafide techno artist." Chang Terhune of Igloo Magazine praised the EP, writing, "Exit Stance is an excellent addition to Broadrick’s catalog, giving the listener plenty to enjoy while tantalizing with the possibility of more like this to come in the future."

Track listing

Personnel
 Justin Broadrick – instruments, production

References

Justin Broadrick albums
Albums produced by Justin Broadrick
2017 EPs